Ymar is also the name of one of the Cthulhu Mythos celestial bodies.

Ymar of Reculver (died c.830) was an Anglo-Saxon saint.

Background
A Benedictine monk of Reculver, Ymar was killed by Danish warriors. His name may be the source of the toponym Margate. A legend states that he had a dying wish to be buried in St Johns Parish Church in Margate. Tradition insists that an old stone coffin lid at that church is his.

References

External links
Kent Archaeological Society, "The Church of St. John the Baptist, Margate", p.72, 1902

830 deaths
Kentish saints
People from the City of Canterbury
English Christian monks
9th-century Christian saints
Year of birth unknown